Bakhmach Raion  was a raion (district) of Chernihiv Oblast, within northern Ukraine. Its administrative center was located at the city of Bakhmach. The raion was abolished on 18 July 2020 as part of the administrative reform of Ukraine, which reduced the number of raions of Chernihiv Oblast to five. The area of Bakhmach Raion was merged into Nizhyn Raion. The last estimate of the raion population was

Subdivisions
At the time of disestablishment, the raion consisted of three hromadas:
 Bakhmach urban hromada with the administration in Bakhmach;
 Baturyn urban hromada with the administration in the city of Baturyn;
 Dmytrivka settlement hromada with the administration in the urban-type settlement of Dmytrivka.

Climate 
The climate is continental. The soils are chernozem, humus, meadow and peaty.

Minerals (nonmetallic): loam, peat bogs.

Raion Industries 
The main industry types within the Raion were:  oil, whole milk products, conserved milk products, meat and meat products, bakery products, agriculture – grain and seed with the development of animal stock.

Transportation 
The roads in the raion were E101, М02 and E381.

History 
The origins of the Bachmach Raion date back to a time when the powerful Chernihiv principality was formed, the borders of which were stretched away beyond Klyazma.

Politics 
On May 25, 2014 when presidential elections took place in Ukraine 46 polling stations were created within the Bakhmach Raion with election turnout at 63.09% (23,428 votes from 37,137 voters). The largest number of votes received: Poroshenko – 38.54% (9030 voters); Oleg Lyashko – 25.16% (5894 voters), Yulia Tymoshenko – 21.97% (5147 voters), Anatoliy Gritsenko – 5,74% (1345 voters). The rest of the candidates gained fewer votes. Number of invalid ballots spoiled or – 1.05%. [1]

Famous people from Bakhmach Raion 
Petro Prokopovych was the founder of world's commercial beekeeping who practiced, researched and taught in the local villages of Mytchenky and Palchyky.

Settlements 

*This is not a complete list of settlements, and needs revision especially during 'Decentralization'(Dec 2016).

References

External links 
 Бахмацька райрада
 Бахмацький район на сайті ОДА
 Бахмацький район на сайті Облради
 Історична довідка Бахмацького району

Former raions of Chernihiv Oblast
1923 establishments in Ukraine
Ukrainian raions abolished during the 2020 administrative reform